Ainamoi is an electoral constituency in Kenya. It is one of six constituencies of Kericho County. The constituency was established for the 1997 elections.

Members of Parliament

Election Results

2017 General Election

Villages

Major centres

Wards

References 

Constituencies in Kericho County
Constituencies in Rift Valley Province
1997 establishments in Kenya
Constituencies established in 1997